The Brothers Karamazov (French: Les frères Karamazoff) is a 1931 French drama film directed by Fedor Ozep and starring Fritz Kortner, Anna Sten and Hanna Waag. It was produced by Pathé-Natan as the French-language version of the German film The Murderer Dimitri Karamazov. It is based on the novel The Brothers Karamazov by Fyodor Dostoevsky. The film's sets were designed by the art director Jean Perrier.

Cast
 Fritz Kortner as 	Dimitri Karamazoff
 Anna Sten as 	Grouschenka
 Hanna Waag as 	Katia
 Fritz Rasp as 	Smerdiakoff
 Max Pohl as 	Le père Karamazoff
 Héléna Manson as Fénia
 Aimé Clariond as 	Ivan Karamazoff
 André Dubosc as 	Le procureur

References

Bibliography 
 Goble, Alan. The Complete Index to Literary Sources in Film. Walter de Gruyter, 1999.
 Parish, James Robert. Film Actors Guide: Western Europe. Scarecrow Press, 1977.

External links 
 

1931 films
French drama films
French black-and-white films
1931 drama films
1930s French-language films
Films directed by Fedor Ozep
Films based on The Brothers Karamazov
Pathé films
1930s French films